William Palacio (born 27 March 1965) is a Colombian former racing cyclist. He rode in nine Grand Tours between 1988 and 1992 and competed in the individual pursuit and points race events at the 1984 Summer Olympics.

Major results
1985
 9th Overall Tour de l'Avenir
1986
 3rd Overall Clásico RCN
1988
 2nd Overall Vuelta a Murcia
 9th Trofeo Masferrer
1990
 8th Overall Vuelta a Colombia
1992
 1st Stage 7 Critérium du Dauphiné Libéré
 2nd Overall Vuelta a los Valles Mineros

Grand Tour general classification results timeline

References

External links
 

1965 births
Living people
Colombian male cyclists
Olympic cyclists of Colombia
Cyclists at the 1984 Summer Olympics
Sportspeople from Valle del Cauca Department
20th-century Colombian people